Janak Kumari Chalise is a Nepalese politician of Lalitpur district, a member of the Central Committee of Communist Party of Nepal (Marxist-Leninist) and the All Nepal Progressive Women’s Association.

After the 2008 Constituent Assembly election she became a Constituent Assembly member.

References

Living people
Communist Party of Nepal (Marxist–Leninist) politicians
21st-century Nepalese women politicians
21st-century Nepalese politicians
Year of birth missing (living people)
Members of the 1st Nepalese Constituent Assembly